Benjamin Jack Schall (December 8, 1917 – February 9, 1998) was an American professional basketball player. He played in the National Basketball League for the Toledo Jim White Chevrolets and Toledo Jeeps. In seven career games he scored three total points.

References 

1917 births
1998 deaths
American men's basketball players
United States Army personnel of World War II
Basketball players from Cleveland
Forwards (basketball)
Toledo Jeeps players
Toledo Jim White Chevrolets players
Toledo Rockets men's basketball players